Litvinenko is a gender-neutral Slavic surname. It may refer to
Alexander Litvinenko (1962–2006), former Russian secret service agent, defector and recruited to MI6, poisoned in the United Kingdom.
Alexei Litvinenko (born 1980), Kazakhstani ice hockey defenceman
Alina Litvinenko (born 1995), Kyrgyzstani football striker
Irina Ektova (née Litvinenko in 1987), Kazakhstani triple jumper
Oleg Litvinenko (1973–2007), Kazakhstani association football player
Olga Litvinenko (born 1983), Russian politician, daughter of Vladimir
Vladimir Litvinenko (born 1955), Russian academic and businessman, father of Olga
Vladimir Litvinenko (sledge hockey) (born 1989), Russian sledge hockey player

See also
 
 Litvin
 Lytvynenko